The following events occurred in October 1924:

October 1, 1924 (Wednesday)
Stanley Baldwin's Conservative Party tabled a motion of censure against Ramsay MacDonald's Labour government over its handling of the Campbell Case. The motion alleged improper interference with the judiciary after the government vetoed the setting up of an inquiry into the matter.
Baseball commissioner Kenesaw Mountain Landis banned New York Giants player Jimmy O'Connell and coach Cozy Dolan over a bribery scandal. They were charged with offering Philadelphia Phillies shortstop Heinie Sand $500 to throw a game on September 27 to help the Giants win the National League pennant.
The U.K. Liberal Party broke with Ramsay MacDonald's Labour government when it announced that it would not vote to ratify the treaties that the government had signed with the Soviet Union. The Liberals passed a motion in a party meeting declaring that that could not approve a treaty which "threatens to divert resources which are urgently needed for national and imperial development, and which amongst other objections contemplates that the British taxpayer should be made liable for further loans to the Russian state."
Born: Jimmy Carter, 39th President of the United States, in Plains, Georgia; William Rehnquist, Chief Justice of the United States, in Milwaukee, Wisconsin (d. 2005)

October 2, 1924 (Thursday)
The Geneva Protocol for the Pacific Settlement of International Disputes received preliminary approval at the League of Nations. The agreement was not binding until formal approval had been given by all governments concerned, and it was understood that it would not be very meaningful until after a world disarmament conference was concluded the next year. The Protocol included a very controversial piece of wording added at the insistence of Japan, which allowed for the restriction of immigration to become a matter of international jurisdiction if it endangered the peace.
Cesáreo Onzari of Argentina scored a direct goal from a corner kick against Uruguay, who had recently won the 1924 Olympic title. For this reason the direct goal from a corner kick is called an Olympic goal or gol olímpico in Latin America.
Baseball commissioner Kenesaw Mountain Landis said the World Series would go forward despite the bribery scandal. "Inside of four days after the attempted bribery of Sand of the Phillies had occurred, the guilty persons had been placed on baseball's ineligible list. Surely our speedy action in the matter must indicate that the game is being kept clean", he said. 
Born: Ruby Stephens, baseball player. in Clearwater, Florida (d. 1996)

October 3, 1924 (Friday)
Britain's Evening Standard blasted the Geneva Protocol and called on Australia, Canada and New Zealand to quit the League of Nations over it, pointing out that if Australia refused to submit to Japan's demand that it alter its immigration policy, the British fleet might be called upon to impose a naval blockade in the name of the League.
A conference in London between the United Kingdom and Egypt on the issue of Egyptian independence ended without success.
Hussein bin Ali passed rulership of the Kingdom of Hejaz to his son Ali and went into exile.
A feud erupted between major league baseball commissioner Kenesaw Mountain Landis and American League president Ban Johnson. Johnson told the media that he would pursue an independent investigation of the circumstances under which the New York Giants won the pennant, and that they should be forbidden from playing in the World Series. "It stands to reason that one or two men can't throw a baseball game", Johnson said. "As a rule, to throw a game you have got to get at least four or five men to be crooked, including the pitcher. I just want to know how many players were involved." Johnson also called Landis a "wild-eyed, crazy nut" who was "protecting the crooks" by failing to investigate the scandal more thoroughly.

October 4, 1924 (Saturday)
In the Second Zhili–Fengtian War, Zhang Zuolin won a major victory at Fengtian.
The First Division Monument was dedicated in Washington, D.C. During his dedication speech, U.S. President Calvin Coolidge briefly remarked on the Geneva Protocol. "We do not propose to entrust to any other power or combination of powers any authority to make up our minds for us", Coolidge stated. "I am in favor of treaties and covenants conforming to the American policy of independence to prevent aggressive war and promote permanent peace. But they have little value unless the sentiment of peace is cherished in the hearts of the people."

October 5, 1924 (Sunday)
A harsh ordinance was issued in British India aimed at suppressing "terrorists". Pro-independence nationalists such as Subhas Chandra Bose would be arrested under the new law.
Nicaragua held a general election, won by Carlos José Solórzano.
7 died and 48 were injured during rioting in Camagüey, Cuba during a political rally for presidential candidate Mario Menocal ahead of the country's general election.

October 6, 1924 (Monday)
Ali of Hejaz was proclaimed the new King of Hejaz.
John W. Davis dismissed Calvin Coolidge's recent isolationist statement on American foreign policy as "stale and vapid formulae", saying, "I am not aware that any American, either now or in the past, has entertained any different idea, and I do not think any one will do so in the future." 
Rai Radio 1 began broadcasting from Rome as 1-RO.
Born: Chris Rogers, horse racing jockey, in Hamilton, Ontario, Canada (d. 1976)

October 7, 1924 (Tuesday)
The British Labour Party ruled out affiliation with the Communist Party by a card vote of 3,185,000 to 193,000 at Labour's national congress in London. "Communism is nothing practical. It is a product of czarism and war betrayal, and as such we will have nothing to do with it", Prime Minister Ramsay MacDonald said.

October 8, 1924 (Wednesday)
Ramsay MacDonald and his Labour Party were defeated in the House of Commons by a vote of 364 to 198, on a vote of censure over the government's handling of the Campbell Case.
Born: Alphons Egli, Swiss politician (d. 2016); and John Nelder, British statistician, in Brushford, Somerset, England (d. 2010)

October 9, 1924 (Thursday)
Ramsay MacDonald advised King George V to dissolve parliament. The King agreed and new elections were set for October 29.
Soldier Field opened in Chicago, as Municipal Grant Park Stadium.
Died: Jake Daubert, 40, American baseball player

October 10, 1924 (Friday)
Walter Johnson pitched four shutout innings of relief as the Washington Senators beat the New York Giants, 4 to 3, in 12 innings to win the World Series in a winner-take-all Game 7. This game is considered by some sports historians to be one of the greatest baseball games ever played and the conclusion of one of the most exciting World Series of all time.
The Commonwealth Electoral Act made compulsory voting the law in Australia.
Born: Margaret Fulton, food writer, in Nairn, Scotland (d. 2019); Ed Wood, filmmaker, in Poughkeepsie, New York (d. 1978)

October 11, 1924 (Saturday)
The H. J. Heinz Company celebrated its fifty-fifth birthday with banquets in different American cities. President Calvin Coolidge used the occasion to make a radio address from the White House about business that was carried in 70 cities.
Baseball commissioner Kenesaw Mountain Landis made his first public response to Ban Johnson's criticisms of his handling of the recent bribery scandal, saying, "Answer Johnson? I don't have to... it has been done by the President of the United States." Calvin Coolidge, who attended three of the games played in Washington, said that "The contests which I witnessed maintained throughout a high degree of skill and every evidence of a high class of sportsmanship that will bring to every observer an increased respect for and confidence in our national game."
Born: Mal Whitfield, athlete, in Bay City, Texas (d. 2015)

October 12, 1924 (Sunday)
Stadion Brügglifeld opened in Aarau, Switzerland.
Gerald Chapman murdered Police Officer James Skelly of the New Britain Police Department during a crime spree in Connecticut.
The film Helen's Babies, starring Diana Serra Cary and Clara Bow, was released.
Died: Anatole France, 80, French poet, journalist and novelist

October 13, 1924 (Monday)
In the Saudi conquest of Hejaz, the Wahabis captured Mecca.
The Buster Keaton comedy film The Navigator was released.
Henry Ford withdrew his long-stalled bid to buy the nitrate works and dam at Muscle Shoals, Alabama.
Born: Moturu Udayam, politician and women's activist, in Guntur district, British India (d. 2002)

October 14, 1924 (Tuesday)
University of Minnesota's Memorial Stadium opened.
Born: Robert Webber, actor, in Santa Ana, California (d. 1989)
Died: Frank B. Brandegee, 60, American politician (suicide)

October 15, 1924 (Wednesday)
The first Surrealist Manifesto was published.
The Prince of Wales arrived in Toronto from Detroit and participated in a fox hunt.
Born: Lee Iacocca, businessman, in Allentown, Pennsylvania; Mark Lenard, actor, in Chicago (d. 1996)

October 16, 1924 (Thursday)
The blues standard "See See Rider" was first recorded, by Ma Rainey.
Born: Gerard Parkes, actor, in Dublin, Ireland (d. 2014)

October 17, 1924 (Friday)
An all-star cast of Broadway performers, including Al Jolson, Raymond Hitchcock, Charlotte Greenwood and Francine Larrimore met with President Calvin Coolidge at the White House for breakfast. The media event was the brainchild of public relations specialist Edward Bernays and marked a groundbreaking example of a staged attempt to improve a politician's image by having him associate with popular celebrities.

October 18, 1924 (Saturday)
Police in Berlin put on a media display of all the evidence they had uncovered of a "false passport factory" that communist agents used to operate in the United States and other countries under false identities. 
President Calvin Coolidge donated a "President's Cup" to be awarded to the winner of the Army–Navy Game.

October 19, 1924 (Sunday)
The 1924 Cuba hurricane, the earliest officially classified Category 5 Atlantic hurricane, struck western Cuba in Pinar del Río Province.
The film The Border Legion premiered in New York City.
Antonio Ascari won the Italian Grand Prix.
Died: Louis Zborowski, 29, English race car driver and automobile engineer (car crash during Italian Grand Prix)

October 20, 1924 (Monday)
German President Friedrich Ebert dissolved the Reichstag and called for new elections on December 7. The cabinet of Chancellor Wilhelm Marx fell apart after he granted three seats to nationalist parties in exchange for their voting to ratify the Dawes Plan, and the various factions were unable to cooperate afterward.
While the light cruiser  was conducting gunnery drills off the Virginia Capes, a powder bag exploded, killing 14.
The Hilldale Club defeated the Kansas City Monarchs 5-0 to win the first Colored World Series, five games to four.

October 21, 1924 (Tuesday)
Parliamentary elections were held in Norway. The result was a victory for the Conservative Party–Liberal Left Party alliance, which won 54 of the 150 seats in the Storting.
The German National People's Party issued an official proclamation announcing itself in favour of restoring the monarchy and terminating the Treaty of Versailles and the Dawes Plan.
Born: Joyce Randolph, actress, in Detroit, Michigan

October 22, 1924 (Wednesday)
The first Toastmasters club was founded in Santa Ana, California.

October 23, 1924 (Thursday)
Feng Yuxiang switched sides in the Second Zhili–Fengtian War and seized the capital in the Beijing Coup.
The Canadian province of Ontario held a referendum on prohibition. A narrow majority of 51.5% percent of voters chose to continue the Ontario Temperance Act.

October 24, 1924 (Friday)
The British Foreign Office published the Zinoviev letter, allegedly a directive from Moscow addressed to the executive committee of the Communist Party of Great Britain, calling for intensified communist agitation in Britain. The Office lodged a vigorous protest with the Soviet Union.
Éamon de Valera was arrested in Newry as he was entering the town hall where a meeting in the interests of a Sinn Féin candidate was being held. The police drew revolvers to keep back angry crowds. De Valera was charged with entering a prohibited area under the Civil Powers Act.
Belgium signed the Geneva Protocol.
Crown Princes Wilhem of Germany and Rupprecht of Bavaria reconciled after a six-year feud.
The Prince of Wales ended his visit to the United States and Canada.

October 25, 1924 (Saturday)

The world's leading air conditioner brand, Daikin Industries, was founded in Osaka, Japan. (as name of predecessors for Osaka Metal Industry.)
Indian nationalist Subhas Chandra Bose was arrested on trumped-up charges of plotting to overthrow the government.
The sea cryptid known as "Trunko" was reportedly sighted at Margate, South Africa. Based on photographs of its globster it is now believed to have been a whale carcass.
The Zinoviev letter was the leading story in every British newspaper with only four days left before the general election. Prime Minister Ramsay MacDonald sent out instructions to all Labour Party candidates to drop their support for the Anglo-Soviet trade agreement. The Communist Party of Great Britain issued a statement in which it denied ever receiving the letter and declared it a forgery.
 The Sherlock Holmes short story "The Adventure of the Three Garridebs" by Sir Arthur Conan Doyle was published for the first time in Collier's Weekly in the United States.
Born: Billy Barty, actor, in Millsboro, Pennsylvania (d. 2000)
Died: Henry Cantwell Wallace, 58, United States Secretary of Agriculture

October 26, 1924 (Sunday)
The Soviet Union denied the authenticity of the Zinoviev letter and demanded an apology from Britain.

October 27, 1924 (Monday)
Prime Minister Ramsay MacDonald said he believed the Zinoviev letter was authentic and denied that the British government had delayed its publication.
A blockbuster baseball trade saw Wilbur Cooper, Charlie Grimm and Rabbit Maranville of the Pittsburgh Pirates dealt to the Chicago Cubs in exchange for Vic Aldridge, George Grantham and prospect Al Niehaus. 
The Uzbek Soviet Socialist Republic was established.
Died: Albert Henry Loeb, 56, Chicago attorney, business executive and father of Richard Loeb of the Leopold and Loeb murder duo

October 28, 1924 (Tuesday)
Reports circulated that Feng Yuxiang had been assassinated.
France extended de jure recognition to the Soviet Union.
Many prominent Spaniards opposed to the dictatorship of Miguel Primo de Rivera were arrested at a meeting in Madrid. The writer Pedro Sainz was among those imprisoned. General Dámaso Berenguer was present but not arrested at the time.
Born: Christine Glanville, puppeteer, in Halifax, West Yorkshire, England (d. 1999)

October 29, 1924 (Wednesday)
Stanley Baldwin's Conservative Party was swept back into power with a majority government in the United Kingdom general election.
Died: Frances Hodgson Burnett, 74, Anglo-American writer; John Marden, 69, Australian headmaster and pioneer of women's education

October 30, 1924 (Thursday)
Thomas Midgley Jr. participated in a press conference to demonstrate the apparent safety of Tetraethyllead (TEL), in which he poured it over his hands, placed a bottle of the chemical under his nose, and inhaled its vapor for 60 seconds, declaring that he could do this every day without succumbing to any problems.
Henry Ford endorsed Calvin Coolidge for re-election, calling him "short on promises and long on action."
Born: Cal Gardner, hockey player, in Transcona, Winnipeg, Manitoba, Canada (d. 2001)

October 31, 1924 (Friday)
 The government of Miguel Primo de Rivera had Spain's highest general, Dámaso Berenguer, sentenced to six months' imprisonment for insubordination. All others present at the meeting of October 28 were condemned to solitary confinement for an indefinite period without trial.
 The Japan Swimming Federation was founded.
 The Ukraine sports club Dynamo was founded.

References

1924
1924-10
1924-10